Archie Duncan (26 May 1914 – 24 July 1979) was a Scottish actor born in Glasgow.

Duncan's father was a regimental sergeant major in the army and his mother was a postmistress. He attended Glasgow's Govan High School and worked as a welder in Glasgow shipyards for a decade.

He began his career in repertory theatre and West End plays. His professional acting debut was in Juno and the Paycock in May 1944 at the Alhambra Theatre, Glasgow.

Although he appeared in over 50 television series and movie roles, he is best remembered for Inspector Lestrade in the 1954 series Sherlock Holmes and Little John in The Adventures of Robin Hood from 1955 to 1959. 

Duncan was replaced in the Little John role by Rufus Cruikshank for 13 episodes after Duncan was injured when a horse bolted toward spectators, mostly children, watching the location filming of the episode "Checkmate" on 20 April 1955. He grabbed the bridle, stopping the horse, but the cart it was pulling ran over him causing a fractured kneecap and cuts and bruises. He received the Queen's Commendation for Brave Conduct and £1,360 in damages from Sapphire films.

He also played the ditch digger in the 1969 film Ring of Bright Water who dispatched the star otter Mij with his spade, towards the end.

On 24 July 1979 Duncan died at home in London. He was 65.

Filmography

References

External links
 

1914 births
1979 deaths
Scottish male film actors
Scottish male television actors
Male actors from Glasgow
20th-century Scottish male actors
Recipients of the Queen's Commendation for Brave Conduct